Adryas bochica is a species of bee in the genus Adryas of the family Trichogrammatidae. It was first described by Pinto and Owen in 2004. Holotypes of the species are stored in the Riverside Entomology Department collection of the University of California.

Etymology 
Adryas bochica is named after the mythological Bochica, messenger god in the religion of the Muisca.

Habitat 
The species has also been discovered in Belize, Costa Rica and Ecuador.

See also 

List of flora and fauna named after the Muisca

References 

Trichogrammatidae
Diptera of South America
Arthropods of Colombia
Insects of Central America
Invertebrates of Ecuador
Endemic fauna of Colombia
Magdalena Department
Bochica
Insects described in 2004